Shadow Lawn may refer to:

Shadow Lawn (New Jersey), at Monmouth University
Shadow Lawn (Lincolnton, North Carolina)
Shadow Lawn (Chase City, Virginia)

See also
Shadow Lawn Historic District (Austin, Texas)
Shadowlawn Historic District (Memphis, Tennessee), listed on the National Register of Historic Places in Shelby County, Tennessee